Spiegelberg Stadium, sometimes called Spieg, is a multipurpose sports stadium in the northwest United States, located in Medford, Oregon. Known as Medford Stadium until 1983, it is the home venue for both the North Medford High School and South Medford High School football programs. At capacity, Spiegelberg holds nearly 10,000 spectators in its home and away grandstands, both of which are covered. It is a unique high school football venue in the state of Oregon.

The 3A football program from nearby St. Mary's High School also uses Spiegelberg for home games, held on Saturday to avoid conflict with the larger schools contests.

Spiegelberg is home to Newland Track, which has a blue track surface. In 2004, Spiegelberg had FieldTurf installed and the track was resurfaced.

Annual events

Black and Blue Bowl

Every year a football game between crosstown rivals South Medford High School and North Medford High School is played. It is one of the biggest events held at Spiegelberg. Since both teams share the stadium there isn't any home field advantage.

Wins:

North Medford   (19)
1989, 1990, 1992, 1993, 1994, 1995, 1997, 1998, 1999, 2000, 2001, 2003, 2005, 2006, 2013, 2014, 2015, 2019,
2022

South Medford  (18)
1986, 1987, 1988, 1991, 1996, 2002, 2004, 2007, 2008, 2009, 2010, 2011, 2012, 2016, 2017, 2018, 2020, 2021

Last 15 years 
2006: North Medford 21, South Medford 0
2007: South Medford 21, North Medford 12
2008: South Medford 35, North Medford 14
 2009: South Medford 28, North Medford 21
 2010: South Medford 31, North Medford 7
 2011: South Medford 56, North Medford 0
 2012: South Medford 38, North Medford 3
 2013: North Medford 42, South Medford 14
 2014: North Medford 49, South Medford 22
 2015: North Medford 24, South Medford 14
 2016: South Medford 31, North Medford 21
 2017: South Medford 55, North Medford 6
2018: South Medford 35, North Medford 0
 2019: North Medford  52, South Medford 21
2020 (postponed to spring of 2021): South Medford 35, North Medford 34
2021: South Medford  40, North Medford 34
2022: North Medford 35 , South Medford 0

Black and Maroon Bowl
This is also an annual game between the cross town rivals Hedrick Middle School and McLoughlin Middle School. While this event is not nearly as big as the Black and Blue Bowl, it is the Game of the Year for middle school students in Medford.

 1999: Hedrick 42, Mcloughlin 8
 2006: Hedrick 28, McLoughlin 0
 2007: Hedrick 38, McLoughlin 0
 2008: Hedrick 30, McLoughlin 6
 2009: Hedrick 35, McLoughlin 21
 2010: Hedrick 35, McLoughlin 0
 2011: McLoughlin 28, Hedrick 20
 2012: Hedrick 14, McLoughlin 7
 2013: McLoughlin 22, Hedrick 0

See also
Medford School District 549C

References

 http://www.highschoolsports.net/defaultcal300x250.cfm?ct=pressbox&schoolid=OR9750418315&timeoffset=300

External links
 Medford School District Website
 South Medford High School Website
 North Medford High School Website
 

Sports venues completed in 1936
Sports venues in Oregon
Buildings and structures in Medford, Oregon
Soccer venues in Oregon
High school sports in Oregon
Education in Medford, Oregon
1936 establishments in Oregon
Sports in Medford, Oregon
American football venues in Oregon
High school football venues in the United States